Redmond is a town in Sevier County, Utah, United States. The population was 730 at the 2010 census.  Redmond was first settled in 1876, and named for red mounds to the west of the town.

Geography
According to the United States Census Bureau, the town has a total area of 1.0 square miles (2.6 km2), of which 1.0 square mile (2.5 km2) is land and 0.04 square mile (0.1 km2) (2.02%) is water.

Climate
This climatic region is typified by large seasonal temperature differences, with warm to hot (and often humid) summers and cold (sometimes severely cold) winters.  According to the Köppen Climate Classification system, Redmond has a humid continental climate, abbreviated "Dfb" on climate maps.

Demographics

As of the census of 2000, there were 788 people, 243 households, and 202 families residing in the town. The population density was 812.6 people per square mile (313.7/km2). There were 262 housing units at an average density of 270.2 per square mile (104.3/km2). The racial makeup of the town was 98.22% White, 0.13% African American, 0.13% Asian, 1.14% from other races, and 0.38% from two or more races. Hispanic or Latino of any race were 1.90% of the population.

There were 243 households, out of which 46.9% had children under the age of 18 living with them, 74.9% were married couples living together, 5.8% had a female householder with no husband present, and 16.5% were non-families. 14.8% of all households were made up of individuals, and 7.0% had someone living alone who was 65 years of age or older. The average household size was 3.24 and the average family size was 3.64.

In the town, the population was spread out, with 36.4% under the age of 18, 9.9% from 18 to 24, 26.0% from 25 to 44, 17.6% from 45 to 64, and 10.0% who were 65 years of age or older. The median age was 28 years. For every 100 females, there were 99.5 males. For every 100 females age 18 and over, there were 102.0 males.

The median income for a household in the town was $40,313, and the median income for a family was $41,875. Males had a median income of $36,250 versus $19,375 for females. The per capita income for the town was $12,620. About 12.5% of families and 12.3% of the population were below the poverty line, including 14.8% of those under age 18 and 4.3% of those age 65 or over.

Economy
Rock salt, which is pink in color, is mined near Redmond, and sold as Real Salt.

References

External links

Towns in Sevier County, Utah
Towns in Utah
Populated places established in 1875
1875 establishments in Utah Territory